Dungeoneer's Survival Guide is a supplement to the Dungeons & Dragons fantasy role-playing game. The book was written by Douglas Niles, and published by TSR, Inc. in 1986.

Contents

The Dungeoneer's Survival Guide describes how to run underground adventures in great detail and includes special rules for movement, combat, mining, and skill proficiencies. The book contains a Dungeon Master's section that covers the underground environment and ecology, as well as the cultures of underground creatures. It includes information on how to make three-dimensional maps, and describes a campaign zone called "Deepearth".

The book includes special game rules for underground activities, combat, travel, and mining, in addition to descriptions of the Underdark and the ecology and cultures of its underground inhabitants, as well as a set of Battlesystem rules for mass-combat in underground settings.

The Dungeoneer's Survival Guide includes new proficiencies, as well as ideas for the creation of underground adventures. Characters gain proficiencies by way of "non-weapon proficiency slots", which can be filled with a variety of secondary skills. This book also provides rules on actions such as how well non-thieves climb walls and trees, how far characters can leap across chasms, and how long characters can hold their breath underwater.

The book describes the types of caverns, how player characters may find and enter them, and what may be found there along with the effects of natural hazards, such as cave-ins, floods, underground streams, poisonous gases, volcanoes and lack of oxygen. The book covers the history and relationships of the underground races, and provides advice on how to run interesting underground campaigns.

Publication history
Dungeoneer's Survival Guide was written by Douglas Niles, with cover art by Jeff Easley, and was published by TSR in 1986 as a 128-page hardcover. It also features interior illustrations by Doug Chaffee, Greg Harper, Jim Roslof, and Jeff Easley.

The book was re-packaged with the Dark and Hidden Ways adventure pack in 1990 to clear out the remaining stock of Dungeoneer's Survival Guide, a first edition AD&D title rendered out-of-date with the release of second edition AD&D.

In 1999, a paperback reprint of the first edition was released.

Reception
Jim Bambra reviewed Dungeoneer's Survival Guide for White Dwarf #82, commenting that the book "deserves the attention of all 'AD&D' players – even those who prefer the freedom of the wilderness to the depths of the dungeon". Bambra noted that while the book covers the Underdark in detail, it is also a major expansion of the AD&D rules. He felt that the new proficiencies "add a whole new dimension to 'AD&D' gaming", as PCs "can now do more than just fight and cast spells". He also noted that, with proficiencies, characters "are able to make armour and weapons, train animals, cut gems, fight effectively in the dark, climb mountains, swim, and perform many other activities that were simply impossible before ... A skill system is something 'AD&D' has been lacking for a long time, and it is good to see that this one ... fits smoothly and easily into the game." Bambra praised author Doug Niles for creating a sourcebook that "proves that underground adventures can be a lot more than simply killing the monster and grabbing its treasure ... the underground has been transformed from a bleak and dirty dungeon to an exciting and intriguing underground fairyland". He adds that the suggestions on how to run underground campaigns form one of the best discussions on designing adventures, finding it relevant for any campaign, even those belonging to other game systems. Bambra concludes the review by stating "Dungeoneer's Survival Guide is an excellent product which opens many new and exciting opportunities to adventurers everywhere. Don't be put off by the title - 'DSG' contains plenty for ... even the most adamant of wilderness adventurers."

Reviews
 Casus Belli #34 (Aug 1986)

Further reading
"Sage Advice", Dragon #118.

References

1986 books
Dungeons & Dragons sourcebooks
Role-playing game supplements introduced in 1986